Singles is a compilation album by English alternative rock band Suede, consisting of all of the band's singles over the course of their recording career from 1992 to 2003.

The album also contains two new songs: the single released from this compilation, "Attitude", and "Love the Way You Love". Also, the song "Trash" is an alternative version.

Track listing

Asian limited edition bonus VCD
Live performance recording from Suede's Up Close and Personal tour in Singapore on 15 August 2002.

 "Positivity"
 "The Wild Ones"
 "Untitled"
 "When the Rain Falls"
 "Oceans"
 "Trash"
 "Lazy"
 "The Power"
 "She's in Fashion"

Charts

References

2003 compilation albums
Suede (band) compilation albums
Glam rock compilation albums